Gundega Aria Janfelds Cenne (1933 – December 16, 2009) was a Latvian-born Canadian artist and art educator.

Early life 
Gundega Aria Janfelds was born in Riga, the daughter of Valentins Janfelds and Hilda-Alma Freimanis Janfelds. Her family left Latvia in 1945, lived in a displaced persons camp in Germany, and moved to Montreal in 1949. She graduated from Montreal High School for Girls. She completed a Bachelor of Fine Arts degree at Sir George Williams University in 1956. She also earned a teaching credential at McGill University, and pursued further art training at the Montreal Museum of Fine Arts.

Career 
Cenne made filmstrip illustrations for the Montreal Protestant School Board when she was still a teenager. She illustrated a 1954 French-language textbook, Jouons Book 1. She taught art, and was a member of the Independent Artists' Association of Montreal. She exhibited her paintings in shows in Montreal, Paris, New York, and Toronto as a young woman.

She was a full-time independent artist after she was seriously injured in a car accident in 1963. "I keep my wheelchair condition concealed whenever I am not present, or the public has only seen my photograph," she wrote in 1966, "for I wish to keep my work and my physical condition as two separate entities. I am a painter in my own right, and my physical condition has nothing to do with it." She held a retrospective exhibit in 1969, in Owen Sound, where she lived. In 1975 she was part of a show of six Latvian-Canadian artists at the National Library of Canada. In 1986, her work was exhibited at the Latvian Lutheran Church in Brookline, Massachusetts.

Personal life 
Cenne married orthodontist Ivars Cenne; they had two children, Peter and Lauma. Her daughter, Lauma Kristina Cenne, became a textile artist. Her mother and her husband both died in 2001; she died in 2009, aged 76 years, in Ottawa.

References 

1933 births
2009 deaths
Canadian people with disabilities
McGill University Faculty of Education alumni
Concordia University alumni
Canadian illustrators
Canadian women artists
Wheelchair users
Latvian emigrants to Canada